Zhangjiang Town is a town located in the Pudong District of Shanghai, China. The town hosts an industrial park for high technology companies.

See also
Zhangjiang Hi-Tech Park

External links
Pudong local government website 

Towns in Shanghai
Pudong